Bertrand Denervaud (born 7 May 1970) is a Swiss snowboarder. He competed in the men's halfpipe event at the 1998 Winter Olympics.

References

External links
 

1970 births
Living people
Swiss male snowboarders
Olympic snowboarders of Switzerland
Snowboarders at the 1998 Winter Olympics
People from Fribourg
Sportspeople from the canton of Fribourg